Isabelle Catherine van Assche-Kindt (or Isabel, or Isabella; 23 November 1794 - ?) was a Belgian landscape painter, born in Brussels. She was a pupil of her uncle, Henri Van Assche. Her sister, Amélie van Assche, was a miniaturist. As early as 1812 and 1813, two of her watercolors were displayed in Ghent and Brussels. She was represented in the exhibitions at Ghent in 1826, 1829 (where she took first prize) and 1835; at Brussels in 1827 and 1842; at Antwerp in 1834, 1837 and 1840; and at Liège in 1836. Her subjects were all taken from the neighborhood of Brussels. One of her paintings belongs to the royal collection in the Haarlem Canal Pavilion. In 1828, she married Charles Leon Kindt.

References

1794 births
Year of death missing
Belgian landscape painters
Belgian women artists
Artists from Brussels